The J. Russell Major Prize is an annual prize given to a historian by the American Historical Association for the best book in English about French history.

Background 

The prize was established in memory of J. Russell Major, a distinguished historian who died on December 12, 1998, at the age of 77. He served as a professor of history at Emory University.

Eligibility 

Only the books with a copyright of 2016 are eligible for the 2017 award.

Notable winners 

Past winners of the prize include:

2022 - Sarah C. Dunstan, Race, Rights and Reform: Black Activism in the French Empire and the United States from World War I to the Cold War
2021 - Nimisha Barton, Reproductive Citizens: Gender, Immigration, and the State in Modern France
2020 - Joshua Cole, Lethal Provocation: The Constantine Murders and the Politics of French Algeria
2019 - Venus Bivar, Organic Resistance: The Struggle over Industrial Farming in Postwar France
2018 - Peter Sahlins, 1668: The Year of the Animal in France
2017 - Rafe Blaufarb, The Great Demarcation: The French Revolution and the Invention of Modern Property
2016 - Ethan Katz, The Burdens of Brotherhood: Jews and Muslims from North Africa to France
2015 - Michael Kwass, Contraband: Louis Mandrin and the Making of a Global Underground
2014 - Arlette Jouanna, The St Bartholomew’s Day Massacre: The Mysteries of a Crime of State
2014 - Joseph Bergin, translator, The St Bartholomew’s Day Massacre: The Mysteries of a Crime of State
2013 - Miranda Spieler, Empire and Underworld: Captivity in French Guiana 
2012 - Malick Ghachem, The Old Regime and the Haitian Revolution 
2011 - Jeremy Popkin, You Are All Free: The Haitian Revolution and the Abolition of Slavery
2010 - Stuart Carroll, Martyrs and Murderers: The Guise Family and the Making of Europe 
2009 - Rachel Fuchs, Contested Paternity: Constructing Families in Modern France
2008 - Amalia Kessler, A Revolution in Commerce: The Parisian Merchant Court and the Rise of Commercial Society in Eighteenth-Century France 
2007 - Martha Hanna, Your Death Would Be Mine: Paul and Marie Pireaud in the Great War 
2006 - Todd Shepard, The Invention of Decolonization: The Algerian War and the Remaking of France
2005 - Barbara Diefendorf, From Penitence to Charity: Pious Women and the Catholic Reformation in Paris
2004 - Steven Englund, Napoleon: A Political Life
2003 - Jessica Riskin, Science in the Age of Sensibility: The Sentimental Empiricists of the French Enlightenment
2002 - Robert W. Harms, The Diligent: A Voyage Through the Worlds of the Slave Trade
2001 - Debora Silverman, Van Gough and Gauguin: The Search for Sacred Art
2000 - Daniel Sherman, The Construction of Memory in Interwar France

References

External links

 

Academic awards